Gawler Oval railway station is located on the Gawler line.

History

It is unclear when this station was built.

During 2006 the platform at Gawler Oval was extended to accommodate three carriages and a new passenger shelter installed. Before the platform was lengthened, only two carriages could use the platforms.

Services by platform

References

External links

Railway stations in Adelaide
Gawler, South Australia